Olavsson or Olavssøn may refer to:

Jens Olavssøn Bratt (1505–1548), Norwegian clergyman
Gunnar Olavsson Helland (1852–1938), Norwegian Hardanger fiddle maker
Talleiv Olavsson Huvestad (1761–1847), Norwegian teacher, farmer and politician
Konráð Olavsson (born 1968), Icelandic Olympic handball player
Aasmund Olavsson Vinje (1818–1870), Norwegian poet and journalist

See also
Olofsson
Olufsen
Ólafsson